Sedniv (Ukrainian: Седнів) is a small urban-type settlement in Chernihiv Oblast, Ukraine. It is located in Chernihiv Raion, hosting the administration of Sedniv settlement hromada, one of the hromadas of Ukraine. Population: 

Sedniv is famous for being the hometown of the Lyzohub family of Cossacks. The population of Sedniv suffered from Holodomor, causing it to lose its township in 1932. Sedniv was restored to a town in 1959.

Sedniv is located where the Ruthenian city of Snovsk used to be before it was destroyed by the Tatars in 1239. It is unknown when the town changed its name. In 1648-1781 it was a district (sotnia) seat of the Chernihiv region (polk).

History

Prehistory

Modern researchers trace the history of Sedniv to the Danish settlement of :da:Seden, from which the city got its name. When the territories of the modern-day Chernihiv region were captured by the Rurik dynasty, Sedniv was renamed to Snovesk.

Kyivan Rus'

The settlement is first mentioned in chronicles as an ancient fortress city of Snovsk. In 1068, Prince Sviatoslav with three thousand soldiers defeated 12 000 soldier Cuman army near Snovsk. The name comes from the River Snov ("sleep" - wash, bathe). Folk legend tells other versions of the town's name:

"The devastating hordes of the Crimean Tatars attacked Snovsk, but could not take the city-fortress. The Tatars then called the city of Snovsk "Sidnaame"(сидняме), which translated from Tatar language as if to mean evil and brave. Hence - Sedniv."

From 10th to 11th centuries, Snovsk was one of the strongholds of Kievan Rus', the center of a separate administrative unit - Snovskian Thousand.

From 12th to 13th centuries, Snovsk was a part of the Chernihiv principality that was later destroyed by Tatars invaders in 1239.

In the mid-14th century, the city was incorporated into the Grand Duchy of Lithuania.

Cossack Hetmanate

Between 1648 and 1781 - Sedniv was a sotnia town of the Chernihiv Regiment, and later - the parish town of Little Russia Governorate before being incorporated into Chernihiv Governorate in 1802. The town also housed the Sedniv Regiment for a short time in 1659.

At the end of the 17th century, Sedniv became a chattel of the Cossack Lyzohub family.

Russian Empire

In the middle of the 19th century, the town was divided into two parts: Mills and Tanners. A thriving regional center of tannery, by 1859 Sedniv had 10 tanneries, lard and candle manufactories, as well as 11 mills.

Ukrainian People's Republic

In 1917, Sedniv became part of newly created Ukrainian People's Republic. During the Ukrainian-Soviet War the town was captured by Russian troops on January 20, 1918 and was retaken by joint German and Ukrainian armies on March 18, 1918.

Soviet-aligned Bohun Cossack Regiment attacked the town on January 10, 1919, annexing it into Ukrainian People's Republic of Soviets. 25 UPR soldiers died in the battle; their remains were buried at the local cemetery.

Soviet era

Soviet administration was established in August 1920 with the formation of Sedniv Village Council. During the post-war administrative reform, the town became part of Chernihiv Oblast's Horodnia Raion.

Sedniv was heavily hit by the Holodomor. As the town's inhabitants heavily resisted Soviet collectivization policies, the town was included into the Soviet black boards. At least 145 people perished during this period, and the town itself was downgraded into a village.

2022 Russian invasion of Ukraine

Russian forces entered Sedniv in early morning hours of February 24, 2022. The town was initially used as staging area for further Russian advances in Chernihiv Oblast; according to locals, Russian forces came in three waves.

Local inhabitants reported excessive looting and intimidation by Russian forces; according to local culturologists, a number of places of historical and architectural significance were either damaged or outright destroyed. Days before Russian army officially pulled back from North Ukraine, local media reported that on-the-ground military units were burning corpses of their fallen in a local starch factory furnaces.

Administrative

The village is on the list of historic settlements of Ukraine approved by the Cabinet of Ministers of Ukraine in 2001.

Geography and Climate

The village is located on the River Snov, and sits about 25 km from the railway station in Chernihiv.

Demographics

Population data

Population distribution by native language (2001)

Culture

Historical sites

1. St. George's Church, a wooden church built on or before 1747.
2. Remains of Sedniv's ancient city walls.
3. Lyzohub Manor, a manor formerly belonging to Coloner Iakov Lyzohub of Chernihiv Regiment.
4. Church of the Resurrection of the Christ, Lyzohubs' family crypt. Constructed in 1690.
5. Chernihiv Energy Museum.

Education

During the Soviet era, the Lyzohub Manor was converted into an elementary school by the regional government. A new educational complex, consisting of a kindergarten and a secondary school, was constructed in 2012.

Gallery

References

External links
 Brief information at the Verkhovna Rada website
 Sedniv at the Castles and temples of Ukraine website

Chernigovsky Uyezd
Blackboard places
Urban-type settlements in Chernihiv Raion